The San José Costa Rica Temple is the 87th operating temple of the Church of Jesus Christ of Latter-day Saints (LDS Church).

The church's First Presidency announced on March 17, 1999 that a temple would be built in San José, Costa Rica. The announcement of the San José Costa Rica Temple made it the first temple in Costa Rica and the second temple in Central America.

History
The LDS Church is relatively new in Costa Rica. A U.S. ambassador who was LDS ran the first church meetings from his home between 1943 and 1946. The first Mormon missionaries arrived in 1946, and temporarily left during Costa Rica's 1948 Civil War. By 1974 church membership had grown enough that Costa Rica became its own mission. In 1977 the first stake was created in Costa Rica. In 1992, Boyd K. Packer, a member of the Quorum of the Twelve Apostles, dedicated the land of Costa Rica for missionary work and membership grew even faster.  Today there are 23,000 members in Costa Rica. Before the building of the temple in Costa Rica, members had to travel to the Guatemala City Guatemala Temple. The trip was expensive, costing many families twice their monthly income.

On April 24, 1999 a groundbreaking ceremony and site dedication were held. Lynn G. Robbins, a member of the Seventy and first counselor in the presidency of the Central America Area, presided at the ceremony. Construction began soon after the groundbreaking and progress was quick to reach a deadline of finishing the temple in one year. The deadline was met and the temple was dedicated in June, fourteen months after the announcement to build the temple.

The temple was open for tours May 20–27, 2000. The exterior finish of the temple is made of Blanco Guardiano white marble from the northern Mexican city of Torreón. More than 20,000 people attended the open house and toured the temple. James E. Faust, a member of the First Presidency, dedicated the San José Costa Rica Temple on June 4, 2000. The San José Temple serves over 35,000 church members in twelve stakes and fourteen districts.

In 2020, the San José Costa Rica Temple was closed temporarily during the year in response to the coronavirus pandemic.

See also

 Comparison of temples of The Church of Jesus Christ of Latter-day Saints
 List of temples of The Church of Jesus Christ of Latter-day Saints
 List of temples of The Church of Jesus Christ of Latter-day Saints by geographic region
 Temple architecture (Latter-day Saints)

References

Additional reading

External links
 
San José Costa Rica Temple Official site
 San José Costa Rica Temple at ChurchofJesusChristTemples.org

20th-century Latter Day Saint temples
Religious buildings and structures in Costa Rica
Temples (LDS Church) completed in 2000
Buildings and structures in San José, Costa Rica
Temples (LDS Church) in Latin America
Temples (LDS Church) in North America
The Church of Jesus Christ of Latter-day Saints in Costa Rica
2000 establishments in Costa Rica